The term National Association for Children of Alcoholics may refer to the following organizations:

National Association for Children of Alcoholics (United States), the United States chapter of NACoA
National Association for Children of Alcoholics (United Kingdom), the United Kingdom chapter of NACoA